Blues Busters is a 1950 American comedy film directed by William Beaudine and starring The Bowery Boys. The film was released on October 29, 1950 by Monogram Pictures and is the twentieth film in the series.

Plot
Sach develops an uncanny ability to sing, after having his tonsils removed, and Slip convinces Louie to turn his sweet shop into a nightclub, The Bowery Palace, after unsuccessfully trying to get Sach a singing job at a neighboring club, The Rio Cabana.

After Sach's singing makes him a star, Rick Martin, the owner of the now-rival club, tries to hire him away but is unsuccessful.  Rick gets his lady friend, Lola, to get Sach to sign a contract with him, using the pretense that she is asking for his autograph.  Rick then goes after the Bowery Palace's other star, Sally Dolan.  She, however, does not want to go because Rick is after more than just her singing talent.  She tips off Lola about what Rick is up to and Lola agrees to testify that Sach's signature was just an autograph and not a signed contract, thereby allowing him to return to the Bowery Palace.  However, by this time Sach has gone to a doctor to help cure the "tickle in his throat' and he has lost the ability to sing.

Cast

The Bowery Boys
 Leo Gorcey as Terrance Aloysius 'Slip' Mahoney
 Huntz Hall as Horace Debussy 'Sach' Jones
 William Benedict as Whitey
 David Gorcey as Chuck
 Buddy Gorman as Butch

Remaining cast
 Gabriel Dell as Gabe Moreno
 Adele Jergens as Lola Stanton 
 Bernard Gorcey as Louie Dumbrowski
 Craig Stevens as Rick Martin
 Phyllis Coates as Sally Dolan
 William Vincent as Teddy Davis
 Virginia Herrick (uncredited)

Production
The working title of the film was The Bowery Thrush. It is the last Bowery Boys film with Gabriel Dell. Tired of taking a back seat to co-stars Leo Gorcey and Huntz Hall, he decided to quit the series.

Home media
The film was released twice on home media, first on VHS by Warner Brothers on September 1, 1998 and then Warner Archives released the film on made-to-order DVD in the United States as part of "The Bowery Boys, Volume One" on November 23, 2012.

Soundtrack
 "Wasn't It You?"
 Written by Ben Raleigh and Bernie Wayne
 Played on a radio and sung by Huntz Hall (dubbed by John Laurenz)
 "Joshua Fit the Battle of Jericho"
 Traditional spiritual
 Sung by Adele Jergens in a nightclub (dubbed by Gloria Wood)
 "Bluebirds Keep Singin' in the Rain"
 Written by Johnny Lange and Eliot Daniel
 Published by Bulls Eye Music Inc. (ASCAP)
 Played on piano by Gabriel Dell
 Sung by Huntz Hall (dubbed by John Laurenz)
 Reprised by Huntz Hall in the nightclub (dubbed by John Laurenz)
 "Let's Have a Heart to Heart Talk"
 Written by Billy Austin, Edward Brandt and Paul Landers
 Played on piano by Gabriel Dell
 Sung by Huntz Hall (dubbed by John Laurenz)
 Reprised by Huntz Hall in the nightclub (dubbed by John Laurenz)
 "You Walk By"
 Written by Ben Raleigh and Bernie Wayne
 Played by the orchestra with Gabriel Dell on piano
 Sung by Huntz Hall (dubbed by John Laurenz)
 "Better Be Lookin' Out for Love"
 Written by Ralph Wolf and Johnny Lange
 Sung by Adele Jergens in a nightclub (dubbed by Gloria Wood)
 "Swanee River"
 Written by Stephen Foster (as Stephen Collins Foster)
 Jazzy version played by Gabriel Dell on piano
 Danced to by William 'Billy' Benedict, David Gorcey and Buddy Gorman
 "Dixie's Lan"
 Written by Daniel Decatur Emmett
 Sung by Leo Gorcey

According to a July 3, 1950 The Hollywood Reporter news item, singer Bob Carroll was the singing double for Huntz Hall, but reviews credit John Laurenz as his singing double. Carroll's participation in the final film has not been confirmed.

References

External links
 
 
 
 

1950 films
Bowery Boys films
American black-and-white films
1950s English-language films
1950 comedy films
Monogram Pictures films
Films directed by William Beaudine
American comedy films
1950s American films
Films set in nightclubs
Films about singers